Falcuna synesia is a butterfly in the family Lycaenidae. It is found in Cameroon, Angola, the Democratic Republic of the Congo, the Central African Republic, Gabon, the Republic of the Congo and Equatorial Guinea. The habitat consists of primary forests.

Subspecies
Falcuna synesia synesia (Angola: Cabinda, Democratic Republic of the Congo: Mayumbe)
Falcuna synesia fusca Stempffer & Bennett, 1963 (Cameroon, Central African Republic)
Falcuna synesia gabonensis Stempffer & Bennett, 1963 (Gabon, Congo, Equatorial Guinea: Mbini and Bioko)

References

Butterflies described in 1924
Poritiinae